The Other Side of Cool is an album by R&B artist Babyface, and is a remix compilation of some of his singles.

Track listing 
"It's No Crime" (IJ Extended Mix) (7:44)
"For the Cool in You" (Chicago House Club Vocal Mix) (5:20)
"My Kinda Girl" (Scratch Mix) (7:09)
"Whip Appeal" (The Ultimate Whip Mix) (5:30)
"Tender Lover" (The Long Mix) (7:55)
"Every Time I Close My Eyes" (Timbaland Remix) (4:55)
"How Come, How Long" feat. Stevie Wonder (Laws & Craigie Remix) (6:28)
"Rock Bottom" (CJ Deep Club Mix) (4:30)
"This Is for the Lover in You" feat. Ghostface Killah (Puffy's Face To Face Mix) (4:43)
"When Can I See You" (Urban Soul Basement Mix) (6:40)

Babyface (musician) albums
2005 remix albums
Sony Music remix albums